Kim Sung-min (Korean: 김성민, February 14, 1973June 26, 2016) was a South Korean actor.

Career
Kim made his acting debut in 1995, as a member of the theatre troupe Constellation. In 2002, he rose to stardom in the hit television drama Miss Mermaid. Miss Mermaid screenwriter Im Sung-han cast him again in her next drama, Lotus Flower Fairy (also known as Heaven's Fate, 2004). But when Miss Mermaid was exported to Taiwan and the Philippines, foreign viewers had difficulty pronouncing his given name "Sung-taek," so to further build his Korean Wave profile, Kim adopted the stage name Kim Sung-min in 2005. He then starred in leading roles in Single Again and Tears of Diamond.

Comic supporting roles followed in Couple or Trouble (2006) where he played a selfish yet hapless husband to an heiress, and Family's Honor (2008) where he played a playboy twin brother who has an unlikely romance with a tomboyish policewoman. Then Kim surprised audiences by portraying a darker character, an adulterous husband in What's for Dinner? (2009), followed by his first period drama, The Reputable Family (2010). He also appeared in the popular variety-reality show Qualifications of Men, and during its run was selected as a guest by the United States Air Force Thunderbirds on their 2009 Far East Tour at Osan Air Base.

On December 4, 2010, Kim was arrested in a drug scandal which also implicated other celebrities. During police questioning, he admitted to habitually using methamphetamine and marijuana, and smuggling the former substance into Korea. On January 24, 2011, the Seoul High Court sentenced him to four years in prison; upon Kim's appeal, the jail term was reduced to 30 months suspended for four years, along with two years of probation, 120 hours of community service, 40 hours of substance abuse education, and a  fine. Kim was released from a prison in Uiwang, Gyeonggi Province on March 25, 2011. Because of this, he was dropped from Qualifications of Men and went on a hiatus.

After laying low for two years, Kim made his acting comeback in Can We Get Married? in 2012. Due to the conservatism of Korean network television, he has so far appeared solely in cable dramas, including Can't Stand Anymore (2013), and The Three Musketeers (2014) for which he trained in martial arts, horseback riding and the Manchu language for his role as a Qing dynasty general.

On March 11, 2015, Kim was again arrested for purchasing and ingesting methamphetamine. He allegedly bought 0.8 grams on November 24, 2014, from a dealer who had smuggled the drug from Cambodia. During police questioning, Kim claimed that he only used the drug once, and that his relapse had been caused by troubles in his marriage and a slump in his acting career. For illegal drug use and violating his probation, Kim was sentenced to 10 months in prison and a  fine.

Personal life
Kim married dentist Lee Han-na on February 20, 2013. Lee is the head of a Gangnam dental clinic and has frequently appeared on television to give dental health advice.

Death
On 24 June 2016, Kim Sung Min's wife called police to check on her husband, saying that he had threatened to kill himself following an argument. Police found him attempting to commit suicide by hanging in the bathroom. On 26 June, the police stated Kim Sung Min, who had been in a coma since 24 June, was diagnosed as brain dead at 2AM KST. The diagnosis was confirmed at 10:15 AM KST, and Kim Sung Min's family agreed to donate his organs. The police will have to sign off on the organ donation and a transplant could occur in the afternoon.

Filmography

Television series

Film

Variety show

Theater

Awards and nominations

References

External links
 
 Kim Sung-min at Lobe Entertainment
 Kim Sung-min Fan Cafe at Daum
 
 

1973 births
2016 suicides
South Korean male television actors
South Korean male film actors
South Korean male musical theatre actors
South Korean male stage actors
Suicides by hanging in South Korea
Seoul National University alumni
Male actors from Seoul
2016 deaths